Kamensk-Uralsky, also known as Travyany, is a military air base near the village of Travyanskoye in the vicinity of the city of Kamensk-Uralsky, in the Sverdlovsk Oblast.

The base is home to the 17th Guards Army Aviation Brigade.

The call sign for the airfield is 'Welcome'. In December 2018, the aviation brigade station at the base was reorganized and equipped with Mil Mi-24 attack helicopters, around which a new squadron was formed. Previously the base had been equipped with Mi-8 MTV-5 and Mi-8 MTV-5-1. The airport is notable as one of only two units in Russia that deal with the provision of space flights.

References 

Soviet Air Force bases
Russian Air Force bases
14th Air and Air Defence Forces Army